Swingin' the '20s is an album by saxophonist Benny Carter's Quartet with pianist Earl Hines, recorded in 1958 and released on the Contemporary label.

Reception

At Allmusic, Scott Yanow wrote, "but the results of this 1958 session are relaxed rather than explosive. Carter and Hines explore a dozen tunes with respect and light swing, but one wishes that there were a bit more competitiveness to replace some of the mutual respect". The Penguin Guide to Jazz commented that "The rhythm section was one of the best money could buy at the time", but that the album was "generally pretty bland".

Track listing
 "Thou Swell" (Richard Rodgers, Lorenz Hart) - 2:50
 "My Blue Heaven" (Walter Donaldson, George A. Whiting) - 3:18
 "Just Imagine" (Buddy DeSylva, Lew Brown, Ray Henderson) - 2:31
 "If I Could Be with You (One Hour Tonight)" (James P. Johnson, Henry Creamer) - 2:40
 "Sweet Lorraine" (Cliff Burwell, Mitchell Parish) - 5:00
 "Who's Sorry Now?" (Ted Snyder, Bert Kalmar, Harry Ruby) - 2:23
 "Laugh, Clown, Laugh" (Sam M. Lewis, Ted Fio Rito, Joe Young) - 2:24
 "All Alone" (Irving Berlin) - 3:20
 "Mary Lou" (J. Russel Robinson, Abe Lyman, George Waggner) - 2:50
 "In a Little Spanish Town" (Mabel Wayne, Lewis, Young) - 3:12
 "Someone to Watch over Me" (George Gershwin, Ira Gershwin) - 3:08
 "A Monday Date" (Earl Hines) - 3:08
 "Who's Sorry Now?" [alternate take] (Snyder, Kalmar, Ruby) - 2:44 Bonus track on CD reissue
 "Laugh, Clown, Laugh" [alternate take] (Lewis, Fio Rito, Young) - 2:38 Bonus track on CD reissue	
 "All Alone" [alternate take] (Berlin) - 3:10 Bonus track on CD reissue

Personnel
Benny Carter – alto saxophone, trumpet
Earl Hines – piano
Leroy Vinnegar – double bass
Shelly Manne – drums

References

Contemporary Records albums
Benny Carter albums
1959 albums